Military Band of the Western Military District is a ceremonial band unit of the Russian Armed Forces's which currently serves in the headquarters of the Western Military District. The band is one of one of the oldest military bands in Russia.

History 

Its history dates back to 1882, when Emperor Alexander III signed a decree on the establishment of the Court Brass Band. On October 1, 1917, an order was issued to disband the band due to the Russian Revolution. It was recreated in February 1918 only to be disbanded again three years later in 1921. The Petrograd city government attempted to recreate another band for the city in 1926, which only be active for 4 years until November 1, 1930, when a garrison band was created with Abram Genshaft becoming its first leader. During the Siege of Leningrad, the band took part in the performance of the Dmitri Shostakovich's Symphony No. 7 in 1942. After the war, the band was renamed to the Band of the Leningrad Military District in 1946. The band in its current form has been active since September 2010, when the Leningrad and Moscow military districts, and the Northern and Baltic fleets were merged.

Gallery

See also 
 Military Band Service of the Armed Forces of Russia
 Military Band of the Southern Military District
 Military Band of the Central Military District
 Military Band of the Eastern Military District
 Military Band of the Northern Fleet

External Media 
 Military Band of the Leningrad Military District, 1968 Documentary
Tchaikovsky "Festival Coronation March"
Concert of Russian Western Military District Headquarters Band, 2014
 Autumn Dream - Western Military District Headquarters Band
 The United States Coast Guard Band and HQ Band of the Leningrad Military District performing Hands Across the Sea in 1989

References 

Russian military bands
Military units and formations established in 1882